The Death Notebooks (1974) is a poetry collection by Anne Sexton, her last to be published before her death. (Her last book of previously uncollected poems, The Awful Rowing Towards God, was published posthumously.)

References

1974 poetry books
American poetry collections
Poetry by Anne Sexton
Houghton Mifflin books